Please add names of notable painters with a Wikipedia page, in precise English alphabetical order, using U.S. spelling conventions. Country and regional names refer to where painters worked for long periods, not to personal allegiances.

Perin del Vaga (1499–1547), Italian painter and draftsman
Aramenta Dianthe Vail (1820–1888), American painter
Lajos Vajda (1908–1941), Hungarian painter 
Suzanne Valadon (1865–1938), French painter and model
Víctor Manuel García Valdés (1897–1967), Cuban painter
János Valentiny (1842–1902), Hungarian painter
Nina Petrovna Valetova (born 1958), Soviet/American painter
Pierre Adolphe Valette (1876–1942), French painter
Leo Valledor (1936–1989), American painter
Félix Vallotton (1865–1925), Swiss/French painter and print-maker
Louis Valtat (1869–1952), French painter and print-maker
Anthony van Dyck (1599–1641), Flemish/English court painter
Vincent van Gogh (1853–1890), Dutch painter
Maksimilijan Vanka (1889–1963), Austro-Hungarian (Croatian)/American artist
Bernard van Orley (between 1487 and 1491–1541), Flemish artist and designer
Raja Ravi Varma (1848–1906), Indian painter and lithographer
Kazys Varnelis (1917–2010), Lithuanian/American abstract painter. 
Remedios Varo (1908–1963), Spanish/Mexican artist
Victor Vasarely (1908–1997), Hungarian/French artist
Vladimír Vašíček (1919–2003), Czechoslovak/Czech painter
Fyodor Vasilyev (1850–1873), Russian painter
Apollinary Vasnetsov (1856–1933), Russian painter and graphic artist
Viktor Vasnetsov (1848–1926), Russian artist
Marie Vassilieff (1884–1957), Russian/French artist
György Vastagh (1834–1922) Hungarian painter
Serhii Vasylkivsky (1854–1917), Russian (Ukrainian) artist
János Vaszary (1867–1938), Hungarian painter 
Gee Vaucher (born 1945), English visual artist
Alonso Vázquez (1565 – c. 1608), Spanish sculptor and painter
Philipp Veit (1793–1877), German painter and fresco artist
Verónica Ruiz de Velasco, (born 1968), Mexican/American painter
Diego Velázquez (1599–1660), Spanish royal painter
Jorge Velarde (born 1960), Ecuadorian painter
Adriaen van de Velde (1636–1672), Dutch painter
Esaias van de Velde (1587–1630), Dutch painter
Henry van de Velde (1863–1957), Belgian painter, architect and theorist
Willem van de Velde the Elder (1611–1693), Dutch painter
Willem van de Velde the Younger (1633–1707), Dutch painter
Petrus Van der Velden (1837–1913), Dutch/New Zealand artist
Alexey Venetsianov (1780–1847), Russian painter
Adriaen van de Venne (1589–1662), Dutch painter
Cornelis Verbeeck (1590–1637), Dutch painter
Dionisio Baixeras Verdaguer (1862–1943), Spanish painter
Louis Mathieu Verdilhan (1875–1928), French painter and decorative artist
Vasily Vereshchagin (1842–1904), Russian artist
Fernand Verhaegen (1883–1975), Belgian painter and etcher
Jan Verkolje (1650–1693), Dutch painter, draftsman and engraver
Johannes Vermeer (1632–1675), Dutch painter
Frederik Vermehren (1823–1910), Danish painter
Jan Cornelisz Vermeyen (1500–1559), Dutch painter
Horace Vernet (1789–1863), French painter
Paolo Veronese (1528–1588), Italian painter
Andrea del Verrocchio (c. 1435 – 1488), Italian painter, sculptor and goldsmith
Johannes Cornelisz Verspronck (1600–1662), Dutch painter
Jan Victors (1619–1676), Dutch painter
Joseph-Marie Vien (1716–1809), French royal painter
Maria Helena Vieira da Silva (1908–1992), Portuguese painter
Egon von Vietinghoff (1903–1994), Swiss painter, author and philosopher
Aníbal Villacís (born 1927), Ecuadorian painter
Juan Villafuerte (1945–1977), Ecuadorian painter
Jacques Villon (1875–1963), French painter and print-maker
Romano Vio (1913–1984), Italian sculptor
Eliseu Visconti (1866–1944), Brazilian painter
Ivan Yakovlevich Vishnyakov (1699–1761), Russian painter and muralist
Claes Jansz. Visscher (1587–1652), Dutch draftsman, engraver and cartographer
Keraca Visulčeva (1911–2004), Ottoman/Bulgarian artist and teacher
Oswaldo Viteri (born 1931), Ecuadorian artist
Bartolomeo Vivarini (c. 1432 – c. 1499), Italian painter
Boris Vladimirski (1878–1950), Russian/Soviet painter
Maurice de Vlaminck (1876–1958), French painter
Simon de Vlieger (1601–1653), Dutch painter, designer and draftsman
Hendrick Cornelisz. van Vliet (1612–1675), Dutch painter and interior designer
Willem van der Vliet (1584–1642), Dutch painter
Zygmunt Vogel (1764–1826), Polish painter, illustrator and educator
Karl Völker (1889–1962), German painter and architect
Alfredo Volpi (1896–1988), Brazilian painter
Robert William Vonnoh (1858–1933), American painter
Clark Voorhees (1871–1933), American painter
Lucas Vorsterman (1595–1675), Dutch/Netherlandish engraver
Wolf Vostell (1932–1998), German painter and sculptor
Simon Vouet (1590–1649), French painter
Sebastian Vrancx (1573–1647), Flemish painter and draftsman
Abraham de Vries (1590–1662), Dutch painter
Roelof van Vries (1630–1681), Dutch painter
Cornelisz Hendriksz Vroom, the Younger (1591–1661), Dutch painter
Hendrick Cornelisz Vroom (1566–1640), Dutch painter
Mikhail Vrubel (1856–1910), Russian painter, sculptor and graphic artist
Édouard Vuillard (1868–1940), French painter, decorative artist and print-maker
Beta Vukanović (1872–1972), Serbian painter

References
References can be found under each entry.

V